XS Manchester is an Independent Local Radio station serving Greater Manchester, broadcasting a mix of indie and alternative rock music, speech and news output. The station is owned and operated by Communicorp UK and broadcasts from studios at Spinningfields in Manchester. It is Communicorp UK's only station that does not broadcast a programme service supplied by Global.

As of December 2022, the station broadacasts to a weekly audience of 104,000, according to RAJAR.

History

106.1 Rock Radio 
The station began technical test transmissions on 10 April 2008 and launched, as 106.1 Rock Radio, on 5 May 2008. 

The station organised a 'Free one day festival' to promote its launch. This was held at Cathedral Gardens, with headlining bands Bad Company and Gun with support acts Salford Jets, Letz Zep and Mercury. The performances started at 1:00pm with a countdown to 6:00pm when the station went live. The first voice heard on Rock Radio was the mid-morning presenter Moose.

Due to the mix of output, the original application was made under the name RockTalk. The licence competition included bids by existing licence holders Chrysalis and Emap as well as a number by smaller local groups. Chrysalis Radio's managing director expressed his surprise that the talk/rock hybrid won in preference to a dedicated talk or rock station, both of which had been offered by his group.

Following the award, a decision was made to position the station as a sister to the then newly relaunched Scottish station 96.3 Rock Radio.

Real Radio XS 

On 28 July 2011, GMG Radio announced that the Manchester-based service would be re-branded as Real Radio XS, while the Glasgow-based sister station 96.3 Rock Radio would be sold. The decision was justified by the company on the grounds that the new Real Radio XS service would "benefit from the brand and scale of sister station Real Radio".

On 25 June 2012 it was announced that rival commercial radio operator Global Radio had bought GMG Radio. The division continued to operate separately until 2014 when, following Ofcom's regulatory review into GMG Radio's takeover, Global Radio announced that 106.1 Real Radio XS would be one of eight stations it would be selling to Communicorp.

XS Manchester 
In March 2016, following the relaunch of former parent station Real Radio as Heart North West, Real Radio XS was rebranded as XS Manchester.

In May 2017, XS moved from Salford to new studios at the XYZ building in the Spinningfields district of Manchester City Centre. The station shares facilities with sister station Smooth North West and two Global-owned stations, Heart North West and Capital Manchester.

In December 2019, it was reported that Communicorp had sought permission from Ofcom to change the station format, which if approved would lead to the closure of XS, and Global’s Capital Xtra service being broadcast on 106.1FM in Manchester. In March 2020, this request was rejected by Ofcom.

Transmission 
XS Manchester transmits from City Tower (formerly the Sunley Building) in Piccadilly in Manchester city centre. It has an ERP of 1kW (500W vertical and 500W horizontal) on 106.1 MHz. The station is also available digitally, on the Trial Manchester small-scale DAB multiplex.

References

External links

Radio stations in Manchester
Radio stations established in 2008
2008 establishments in England
Rock radio stations in the United Kingdom
GMG Radio
Real Radio
Communicorp
Adult album alternative radio stations